Jessica Lynne O'Rourke Çarmıklı (born 3 January 1986) is a professional footballer who plays as a midfielder and a defender. She is currently player-manager for the Istanbul-based club Fenerbahçe in the Turkish Women's Football Super League. Born in the United States, she is a member of the Turkey women's national team.

Early life
O'Rourke was raised in Marlton, New Jersey.

Club career

Jessica started her professional career in 2008 with the only professional team in the US at that time, the F.C. Indiana Lionesses. She played a significant role as a defensive midfielder for F.C. Indiana as they won USL W-League Central Conference in 2008; advancing to the Championship Finals where she tallied the only goal for the Lionesses in the 47'.

On January 16, 2009, she was drafted by the Chicago Red Stars of Women's Professional Soccer (WPS) with the 2nd pick of the 9th Round (58th overall).

In 2009, she competed in the United Soccer Leagues' W-League as team Vice Captain for the Buffalo Flash; then played in the Spanish Superliga Femenina with the Club Cajasol Sporting de Huelva.

For the 2010/2011 season, she joined the club Zvezda-2005 in the Russian Women's Football Championship league and the UEFA Women's Champions League.

In November 2016, Jessica signed with the Istanbul-based club Beşiktaş to play in the Turkish Women's First Football League.  After an 18-month absence for maternity, she returned with Beşiktaş J.K. and took part in the first appearance of the club in the 2019–20 UEFA Women's Champions League - Group 9 matches; scoring her first goal in Champions League play against Alashkert in the 87th minute.

On September 3, 2021, Fenerbahçe announced technical staff and Jessica Çarmıklı announced as manager.

International career
By September 2020, O'Rourke Çarmıklı was called up to the Turkey women's national football team to play at the UEFA Women's Euro 2021 qualifying Group A matches. She wore the Turkish national jersey for the first time as she was naturalized through her marriage to a Turkish person. She played at the away match against Kosovo in Antalya on 23 October 2020.

Career statistics
.

Honours
Turkish Women's First Football League
Beşiktaş
 Winners (1): 2020–21
Runners-up (1): 2016–17

Personal life
O'Rourke has resided in Turkey since 2010 and has settled in Istanbul. She is married to Turkish businessman Oğuzhan Çarmıklı. They have two children.

References

1986 births
Living people
People from Evesham Township, New Jersey
Sportspeople from Burlington County, New Jersey
Soccer players from New Jersey
American women's soccer players
Women's association football defenders
Women's association football midfielders
NC State Wolfpack women's soccer players
F.C. Indiana players
Chicago Red Stars players
Sporting de Huelva players
Zvezda 2005 Perm players
USL W-League (1995–2015) players
American expatriate women's soccer players
American expatriate sportspeople in Russia
Expatriate women's footballers in Russia
American expatriate sportspeople in Spain
Expatriate women's footballers in Spain
American emigrants to Turkey
Naturalized citizens of Turkey
Turkish women's footballers
Beşiktaş J.K. women's football players
Fenerbahçe S.K. women's football players
Turkish Women's Football Super League players
Turkey women's international footballers
Turkish people of American descent